The Volkswagen Schwimmwagen (literally "swimming car") was a four-wheel drive amphibious vehicle, used extensively by German ground forces during the Second World War. The Schwimmwagen is the most-produced amphibious car in history.

Prototyped as the Type 128, it entered full-scale production as the Type 166 in 1941 for the Wehrmacht.

Development

Volkswagen Schwimmwagens used the engine and mechanicals of the VW Type 86 four-wheel drive prototype of the Kübelwagen and the Type 87 four-wheel drive 'Kübel/Beetle' Command Car, which in turn were based on the platform of the civilian Volkswagen Beetle. Erwin Komenda, Ferdinand Porsche's first car-body designer, was forced to develop an all-new unitized bodytub structure since the flat floorpan chassis of the existing VW vehicles was unsuited to smooth movement through water. Komenda patented his ideas for the swimming car at the German Patent office.

The earliest Type 128 prototype was based on the full-length Kübelwagen chassis with a  wheelbase. Pre-production units of the 128, fitted with custom welded bodytubs, demonstrated that this construction was too weak for off-road use, had insufficient torsional rigidity, and easily suffered hull-ruptures at the front cross-member, as well as in the wheel-wells. This was unacceptable for an amphibious vehicle.

Schwimmwagens were produced by the Volkswagen factory at Fallersleben /Stadt des KdF-Wagens and Porsche's facilities in Stuttgart; with the bodies (or rather hulls) produced by Ambi Budd in Berlin. 15,584 Type 166 Schwimmwagen were produced from 1941 through 1944; 14,276 at Fallersleben and 1,308 by Porsche; the VW 166 is the most-produced amphibious car in history.
Only 189 are known by the Schwimmwagen Registry to remain today, and only 13 have survived without restoration work.

Technology

All Schwimmwagens were four-wheel drive in first gear (and reverse gears on some models) only and had ZF self-locking differentials on the front and rear axles. As with the Kübelwagen, the Schwimmwagen  had rear portal axles, which provided increased ground clearance, while at the same time reducing drive-line torque stresses with their gear reduction at the wheels. The Schwimmwagen had a top speed of 50 miles per hour (80 km/h) on land.

When crossing a body of water a screw propeller could be lowered down from the rear deck/engine cover. When in place a simple coupling provided drive straight from an extension of the engine's crankshaft. This meant that screw propulsion always drove forward. For reversing in the water there was the choice of using the standard equipment paddle or running the land drive in reverse, allowing the wheel-rotation to slowly take the vehicle back. The front wheels doubled up as rudders, so steering was done with the steering wheel both on land and on water. The Schwimmwagen could also be steered by the passengers using the aforementioned paddles.

Gallery

See also
Trippel SG6 - another German amphibious car used during the Second World War
Amphicar
GAZ-46 (MAV)
DUKW - amphibious truck
LuAZ-967
Ford GPA (A similar Jeep-based vehicle used by the Allies.)
Su-Ki, Japanese World War II boat-hulled amphibious truck

References

Notes

Bibliography 
 René Pohl: Mit dem Auto baden gehen. HEEL Verlag, Gut-Pottscheidt Konigswinter 1998,

External links

 U.S. Intelligence report on German Schwimmwagen
 The VW-Schwimmwagen Registry
 Schwimmwagen enthusiast site
 Schwimmwagen  Photos of the Schwimmwagen at the Canada War Museum in Ottawa
 UK Schwimmwagen owners site

World War II military vehicles of Germany
Schwimmwagen
Rear-engined vehicles
Cars powered by boxer engines
Military light utility vehicles
Military vehicles introduced from 1940 to 1944
Amphibious military vehicles
Wheeled amphibious vehicles
Amphibious vehicles of World War II